Indianola Mississippi Seeds is B. B. King's eighteenth studio album. It was released in October 1970 on ABC Records on LP and May 1989 on MCA Records on CD. On this album B. B. King mixed elements of blues and rock music. Producer Bill Szymczyk decided to follow up on the success of the hit "The Thrill Is Gone" by matching King with a musical all-star cast. The result was one of King's most critically acclaimed albums and one of the most highly regarded blues crossover albums of all time.

The album appeared on several of Billboard's album charts in 1970, reaching number 26 on the Pop album chart, number seven on the Jazz album chart and eight on Billboard's listing for "Black Albums."  The album also generated several hit singles, "Chains and Things", King's own "Ask Me No Questions" and Leon Russell's "Hummingbird".

King himself, also, views the album as one of his greatest achievements.  When asked about his best work, King has said, "I know the critics always mention Live & Well or Live at the Regal, but I think that Indianola Mississippi Seeds was the best album that I've done artistically."

Homage paid to a hometown 
The album title is a tribute to King's upbringing near Indianola, Mississippi. Although King was born on a plantation between two smaller towns, Itta Bena and Berclair, which are actually closer to Greenwood, King has always considered Indianola his hometown.

The album package — which was itself recognized with a Grammy — includes what appears to be a copy of B. B. King's birth certificate with official registration in Indianola.  The liner notes also contain a note that reads, "Congratulations Albert and Nora on your son Riley, September 16, 1925."

Over time, King's hometown has paid respects back to him.  In 2008, the B.B. King Museum and Delta Interpretive Center opened in Indianola, with the mission to "preserve and share the legacy and values of B. B. King, to celebrate the rich cultural heritage of the Mississippi Delta, and to promote pride, hope, and understanding through exhibitions and educated programs."

Critical acclaim 

Indianola Mississippi Seeds is one of three of B. B. Kings recordings listed in The Rough Guide to Blues 100 Essential CDs (along with Live at the Regal and Singin' the Blues). The album was named # 23 on a list of the best "Album Chartmakers by Year" for 1970.<ref name = "lists">Dave Marsh & Kevin Stein, "Top of the Pops: The Best of the Album Chartmakers by Year", Book of Rock Lists", Dell Books, 1981 (reissue November 1982 ) (link to list for 1970)</ref>

 Track listing 
All songs written by B. B. King, except where noted.

 "Nobody Loves Me But My Mother" — 1:26
 B. B. King — piano & vocal 
 "You're Still My Woman" (B. B. King, Dave Clark) — 6:04 
 B. B. King — guitar & vocal
 Carole King — piano
 Bryan Garofalo — bass
 Russ Kunkel — drums
 "Ask Me No Questions" — 3:08 
 B. B. King — guitar & vocal
 Leon Russell – piano
 Joe Walsh – rhythm guitar
 Bryan Garofalo — bass
 Russ Kunkel — drums
 "Until I'm Dead and Cold" — 4:45 
 B. B. King — guitar & vocal
 Carole King — piano
 Bryan Garofalo — bass
 Russ Kunkel — drums
 "King's Special" — 5:13 
 B. B. King — lead guitar
 Leon Russell – piano
 Joe Walsh – rhythm guitar
 Bryan Garofalo — bass
 Russ Kunkel — drums
 "Ain't Gonna Worry My Life Anymore" — 5:18
 B. B. King — guitar & vocal
 Carole King — piano & electric piano
 Bryan Garofalo — bass
 Russ Kunkel — drums
 "Chains and Things" (B. B. King, Dave Clark) — 4:53 
 B.B. King — guitar & vocal
 Carole King — electric piano
 Bryan Garofalo — bass
 Russ Kunkel — drums
 "Go Underground" (B. B. King, Dave Clark) — 4:00 
 B. B. King — lead guitar & vocal
 Paul Harris — piano
 Hugh McCracken — rhythm guitar
 Jerry Jemmott — bass
 Herbie Lovelle — drums
 Joe Zagarino — Engineer
 The Hit Factory, New York City
 "Hummingbird" (Leon Russell) — 4:36 
 B. B. King — guitar & vocal
 Leon Russell — piano & conductor
 Joe Walsh — rhythm guitar
 Bryan Garofalo — bass
 Russ Kunkel — drums
 Sherlie Matthews, Merry Clayton, Clydie King, Venetta Fields — "Angelic chorus"

 Personnel 
B.B. King – Guitar, piano, vocals
Joe Walsh, Hugh McCracken – Guitar
Carole King – Piano, Fender Rhodes (2,4,6,7)
Leon Russell – Piano (3,5,9)
Paul Harris – Piano (8)
Bryan Garofalo, Jerry Jemmott – Bass guitar
Russ Kunkel, Herbie Lovelle – Drums
Bill Szymczyk – producer

 Credits 

Production
 Produced by Bill Szymczyk
 Strings and Horns arranged by Jimmie Haskell
 Recorded at The Record Plant, Los Angeles, California
Engineers — Bill Szymczyk & Gary Kellgren
Assistant Engineers — Llyllianne Douma (Lillian Davis Douma), Mike D. Stone of the Record Plant, & John Henning
 Mastering — Bob Macleod — Artisan Sound Recorders

Other
 Cover design — Robert Lockart
 Photography — Ivan Nagy
 Management — Sidney A. Seidenberg
 Leon Russell appears with love from Shelter Records
 Carole King & Merry Clayton appear through the courtesy of Ode 70 Records
 Congratulations to Albert and Nora on your son Riley, September 16, 1925

 Charts 

Album charts

Singles

 Awards 
Photographer, Ivan Nagy and cover designer, Robert Lockart won the 1971 Grammy for "Best Album Package - Incl. Album Cover, Graphic Arts, Photography" for Indianola Mississippi Seeds''.

Releases

See also 
 B. B. King discography

Notes and sources

External links 
 Indianola Mississippi Seeds discography page from the official B.B. King website

1970 albums
B.B. King albums
Albums conducted by Leon Russell
Albums arranged by Jimmie Haskell
Albums produced by Bill Szymczyk
Albums recorded at Record Plant (Los Angeles)
MCA Records albums
ABC Records albums